The College of Saint Benilde Blazers men's volleyball team and College of Saint Benilde Lady Blazers women's volleyball team is the volleyball teams of De La Salle–College of Saint Benilde.

History
Men's

The CSB Blazers men's volleyball team claimed their first championship title in NCAA Season 92  .

Women's

The CSB Lady Blazers first joined NCAA women's volleyball tournament in 1998. They claimed their first NCAA women's volleyball championship in the NCAA Season 91 beating the thrice-to-beat San Sebastian Lady Stags in 4th sets on the do-or-die Game 4 of the NCAA 
Season 91 finals series. 

In 2022, CSB Lady Blazers bags the NCAA Season 97 women's volleyball tournament championship with no loss. 

Aside from NCAA, CSB Lady Blazers also play in the Shakey's Super League and V-League.

Men's volleyball team roster
NCAA Season 95

Women's volleyball team roster

CSB Lady Blazers
NCAA Season 98

Notable players

Women's
Jeanette Panaga 
Djanel Welch Cheng 
 Rachel Anne Austero 
Melanie Torres 
Klarissa Abriam 
Arianne Daguil 
Francis Mycah Go
Giza Yumang

Men's
Von Mabazza
Ajian Dy
John Vic De Guzman
Isaiah O'Neal Arda 
Kevin Magsino
Arnel Christian Aguilar 
Francis Basilan
Ruvince Abrot

Honors

Men's
NCAA (1)

Women's

References

Women's volleyball teams in the Philippines